Elías José Jaua Milano (born 16 December 1969) is a Venezuelan politician and former university professor who serves as the Minister of Education of Venezuela. He served as the vice president of Venezuela from January 2010 to October 2012 and had been Minister of Foreign Affairs from January 2013 until September 2014.

Career
Jaua obtained a Sociology degree from the Central University of Venezuela. In 2000 he was part of the Comisión  Legislativa Nacional and Minister of the Secretaría de la Presidencia from 2000 to 2001. He was nominated as Venezuelan Ambassador to Argentina in 2002. Jaua served as Minister of Agriculture in President Hugo Chávez's government before being appointed as vice-president in January 2010, while remaining Minister of Agriculture.

On 15 December 2011, following a major reshuffle of the Venezuelan political leadership, President Chávez proposed Jaua to be the PSUV candidate for governor of the state of Miranda (reported in El Universal). He resigned the vice presidency on 13 October 2012 to compete in the election and was replaced by Nicolás Maduro. He lost the election on 16 December 2012 to the former governor Henrique Capriles who had stepped down in June 2012 to unsuccessfully challenge Hugo Chávez for president.

Jaua succeeded Nicolás Maduro as Minister of Foreign Affairs on 15 January 2013.

Sanctions 
Jaua has been sanctioned by several countries and is banned from entering neighboring Colombia. The Colombian government maintains a list of people banned from entering Colombia or subject to expulsion. As of January 2019, the list had 200 people with a "close relationship and support for the Nicolás Maduro regime".

On 26 July 2017, Jaua was involved in targeted sanctions performed by the United States Department of Treasury due to his involvement with the 2017 Venezuelan Constituent Assembly election, being the Head of Venezuela's Presidential Commission for the Constituent Assembly.

Canada sanctioned 40 Venezuelan officials, including Jaua, in September 2017. The sanctions were for behaviors that undermined democracy after at least 125 people were killed in the 2017 Venezuelan protests and "in response to the government of Venezuela's deepening descent into dictatorship".  Canadians were banned from transactions with the 40 individuals, whose Canadian assets were frozen. The sanctions noted a rupture of Venezuela's constitutional order.

On 25 June 2018, the European Union sanctioned Jaua, freezing his assets and imposing a travel ban.

On 29 March 2018, Jaua was sanctioned by Panama for his alleged involvement with "money laundering, financing of terrorism and financing the proliferation of weapons of mass destruction".

On 10 July 2018, Switzerland sanctioned Jaua, citing the same reasons as the European Union, and froze his assets while also imposing a travel ban against him.

See also
List of Ministers of Foreign Affairs of Venezuela
List of foreign ministers in 2013
List of foreign ministers in 2014

References

External links
 "Elías Jaua – interview", World Investment News, 11 September 2006

|- 

1969 births
Living people
Vice presidents of Venezuela
Central University of Venezuela alumni
Venezuelan people of Lebanese descent
People from Miranda (state)
Ambassadors of Venezuela to Argentina
Venezuelan Ministers of Foreign Affairs
People of the Crisis in Venezuela
Members of the Venezuelan Constituent Assembly of 1999
Members of the Venezuelan Constituent Assembly of 2017
Agriculture ministers of Venezuela
Education ministers of Venezuela
Secretariat of the Presidency ministers of Venezuela